WORLD.MINDS (the foundation officially changed its name from "ZURICH.MINDS" in 2016) is a non-profit foundation set up in June 2008 by Rolf Dobelli. The stated goal of the WORLD.MINDS Foundation is "to create a bridge between the science, business and cultural communities."

WORLD.MINDS is composed of the not-for-profit WORLD.MINDS Foundation and "WORLD.MINDS Management Ltd.", the operational event management company that organizes and produces all symposia and events on behalf of the WORLD.MINDS Foundation. On 29 March 2022 Axel Springer announced that it has acquired a majority stake in the event-management company to support its "plans in becoming a leading international forum for exchange of critical insights among world leaders in business, science and politics."

The NZZ called WORLD.MINDS "a community of experts for experts" and described its annual meetings as "a salon for the 21st century".

WORLD.MINDS has received some coverage in local media, such as the Switzerland edition of The Wall Street Journal, Swiss national television, amongst others.

Membership 
Advisory Board members include former US Secretary of State Henry A. Kissinger, former Director of the Central Intelligence Agency David Petraeus, Nobel laureate Joseph F. Stiglitz, Olympic Gold medalist Tenley E. Albright, Chairman of Roche Christoph Franz, Serbian Prime Minister Ana Brnabić, founder of 3G Capital Jorge Paulo Lemann, former Supreme Allied Commander Europe Admiral James G. Stavridis, among others.

Members include Nobel prize laureate Kurt Wüthrich, activist and author Ayaan Hirsi Ali, President of the ETH Board Michael Hengartner, Airbus CTO Grazia Vittadini, philosopher John N. Gray of the London School of Economics, the rector of ETH Zurich Sara Springman, director at the Max Planck Institute for Human Development Gerd Gigerenzer, writer and politician Matt Ridley, Indian artist Aparna Rao, American nuclear engineer and MIT board member Leslie Dewan, economist Paul Romer, investor and author Guy Spier, professor of bioethics at ETH Zurich and Fellow at Harvard's Berkman Klein Center Effy Vayena, neuroeconomist Ernst Fehr, experimental psychologist Roy Baumeister, investor and entrepreneur Daniel Aegerter, Stanford professor of mechanical engineering Allison Okamura, MIT astrophysicist Sara Seager, Harvard psychologist and happiness researcher Dan Gilbert, Polish-born French-American mathematician and polymath Benoit Mandelbrot, along with artists such as Ai Weiwei and US-Israeli architect and designer Neri Oxman.

The meetings are attended by around 400 guests each year while the community altogether has around 1000 members. WORLD.MINDS also holds regular in-depth meetings on specific issues, such as WORLD.MINDS MOBILITY in 2018 with a focus on the future of mobility. In an interview with NZZ, Former Secretary of State Henry Kissinger said concerning WORLD.MINDS that "I don't remember ever having a group that was so harmoniously focused on those things that truly concern us."

History 
In December 2017, former Swiss President Doris Leuthard opened the 2017 WORLD.MINDS flagship Annual Symposium event in Zurich, where the Chinese dissident artist Ai Weiwei spoke with Uli Sigg, the world's largest collector of contemporary Chinese art, about Ai Weiwei's art, his activism and his views on the future of China. Ai Weiwei boldly stated that "no one knows China better than me. I am China." When asked about his captivity in the hands of Chinese authorities, Ai Weiwei confided that he had told his captors "even if you take me out and put a bullet in me right now, you still cannot change me."

In December 2020, former South African President and Nobel Peace Laureate FW de Klerk proclaimed at WORLD.MINDS that South Africa would be like Syria is today, had it not been for the policies put in place by his government to end Apartheid. TRT World moderator Ghida Fakhry had asked President De Klerk if, in addition to the moral principles and economic realities (sanctions) behind ending Apartheid, his government's decision to end the injustice was also done to protect and salvage South Africa for the white minority.

In May 2021, former US Secretary of State Henry Kissinger said in a WORLD.MINDS Zoom call that "a confrontation with China is against the interests of either country, and indeed of the world. This would not be a situation in which there can be a winner in a conflict, but instead the conflict is likely to end much like World War I did with the exhaustion of both parties."

References

External links
Foundation's website

Innovation organizations
International conferences
Organisations based in Zürich
Clubs and societies in Switzerland
Organizations established in 2008
2008 establishments in Switzerland